Les Avions was a French pop rock band formed in 1980 in Paris by Jean-Pierre Morgand. Jean-Pierre played vocals and guitar and was born on January 7, 1959., Jean Nakache (guitar / keyboards) and Jérôme Lambert (drums). The keyboardist Sylvain Pauchard also greatly contributed to Les Avions'albums for the arrangements and programming. The group disbanded in 1997 after an ultimate concert in Moscow on the occasion of the festival named 'Les Allumées'. Their best known song is the hit "Nuit sauvage" in 1986 (#16 in France), but few other singles of the trio also enjoyed a significant broadcasting, such as "Tu changes" (1986), "Noël (tombe la neige)" (1987) and "Tous ces visages" (1989).

Discography

Albums
 1982 : Les Avions
 A-side : "La Planète des singes" - "Trio" - "Des Usines & des Hommes" - "Puzzle & Parallèles"
 B-side : "Un Certain Paradis" - "Twist and Shout" - "Aquarium"
 1987 : Fanfare
 1989 : Loin
 1992 : 4

Compilations
 2002 : Des Jardins et des Ronces, le Best of des Avions

Singles
 1982 : "Trio" / "Twist and Shout"
 1985 : "Nuit sauvage" / "Tour Eiffel" - #16 in France
 1986 : "Be bop" / "Guitare espagnole"
 1987 : "Tu changes" / "Le cyrk"
 1987 : "Tombe la neige" / "Zim bam boum"
 1988 : "Et la fanfare des PTT" / "Medley" ("Nuit sauvage", "Be bop", "Fanfare")
 1988 : "Fanfare"
 1989 : "Tous ces visages" / "Le Train"
 1992 : "Mélodie"
 1992 : "Monsieur Moyen"

References

External links
Jean-Pierre Morgand official site

French pop music groups
Musical groups established in 1980
Musical groups disestablished in 1997
French musical trios
Musical groups from Paris